Bracht may refer to:

Bracht (surname)
Bracht (river), of Hesse, Germany
a division of the town Brüggen, Germany
a division of the town Gummersbach, Germany
a division of the town Rauschenberg, Hesse, Germany
a division of the town Burg-Reuland, Belgium
Bracht (Schmallenberg), a division of the town Schmallenberg, Germany
Bracht–Wachter bodies, yellow-white spots in the myocardium, a finding in endocarditis